The Syriac Union Party abbreviated as SUL is a Lebanese Assyrian/Syriac political party established on 29 March 2005. It expresses points of view of the Assyrian/Syriac minority community in Lebanon without any confessional differences between Syriac Orthodox or Syriac Catholic and is vocal in asking for independent seats for the Assyrians/Syriacs in the Lebanese Parliament, rather than confining them to the "minorities seat" in Beirut as is now the case.

The Syriac Union Party is headed by Ibrahim Murad, and is considered very close with the opposition of the 14 March alliance.

The party endorsed the Lebanese Forces in the 2022 parliamentary elections.

See also
Syriac Union Party (Syria)
Syriac Military Council

References

2005 establishments in Lebanon
Assyrian nationalism
Assyrian political parties
Assyrians in Lebanon
Christian political parties in Lebanon
March 14 Alliance
Dawronoye
Political parties established in 2005
Political parties in Lebanon
Political parties of minorities in Lebanon